Offuman is a town in the Bono East Region of Ghana. Offuman, which is pronounced by the natives as "Fuman" is in the Techiman North District of the Bono East Region of Ghana. It is located at the North-Eastern part of Techiman, 21 kilometers from Tuobodom. It also lies 13 Km South-West of Wenchi. Offuman has a population of 8,277. The king (Omanhene in the Akan language) of Offuman in the 18th century up until the 1930s was  ODikro Kwame Ankomah. 
Later his nephew Nana Kwame Gyamfi kumanini became the successor when he (Nana Kwame Ankomah) passed away. In the early days, the only elementary school in Offuman was the Wesley Methodist School .  The school is a second cycle institution.

References

Populated places in the Bono East Region